Neptis trigonophora, the barred sailer, is a butterfly of the family Nymphalidae. It is found in southern Africa.

Wingspan is 45–50 mm in males and 48–55 mm in females. Adults are on the wing possibly year round with peak from March to April.

The larvae feed on Paullinia pinnata.

Subspecies
Recognised subspecies:
N. t. trigonophora (Kenya, eastern Tanzania, Malawi, Mozambique, eastern Zimbabwe, South Africa: Eastern Cape Province)
N. t. melicertula Strand, 1912 (Senegal, Sierra Leone, Liberia, Ivory Coast, Ghana, Nigeria, Cameroon, Gabon, Congo, Central African Republic, Democratic Republic of the Congo, Uganda, north-western Tanzania, northern Zambia)

References

trigonophora
Butterflies described in 1878
Butterflies of Africa
Taxa named by Arthur Gardiner Butler